The Women's 1500m athletics events for the 2012 Summer Paralympics took place at the London Olympic Stadium from 31 August to 8 September. A total of three events were contested over this distance for three different classifications.

Results

T12

 
 
 
The event consisted of a single race. Results:

T20

 
 
 
The event consisted of a single race. Results:

T54

 
 
 
The event consisted of 2 heats and a final. Results of final:

References

Athletics at the 2012 Summer Paralympics
2012 in women's athletics
Women's sport in London